The Yap monarch (Monarcha godeffroyi), or Yap Island monarch, is a species of bird in the family Monarchidae.
It is endemic to the Yap Main Islands, Micronesia. Some authorities consider the Yap monarch to belong to the genus Metabolus. Its natural habitats are subtropical or tropical moist lowland forests and subtropical or tropical mangrove forests. The natives of Yap Island call it "Gigiy" or "Achgigiy".

References

Yap monarch
Birds of Yap
Yap monarch
Taxonomy articles created by Polbot
Taxobox binomials not recognized by IUCN